Eli King is the name of:

Eli King (footballer), Welsh footballer
Eli C. King, American politician